Watch Out Gringo! Sabata Will Return is a 1972 Spanish western film directed by Alfonso Balcázar and Pedro Luis Ramírez, scored by Piero Piccioni and starring Vittorio Richelmy, George Martin and Fernando Sancho. It is produced by Balcázar Producciones Cinematográficas and Empire Films.

Cast

References

External links
 

Spanish Western (genre) films
Films directed by Alfonso Balcázar
Films with screenplays by José Ramón Larraz
Films scored by Piero Piccioni
Films shot in Barcelona
Films shot in Rome
Filmax films
1972 Western (genre) films
1972 films